Captain Mukesh Singh alias Mukesh Singh Shaktawat is an Indian politician from the Bharatiya Janata Party and representing the Jahazpur Vidhan Sabha constituency of Rajasthan.

References

External links
 

Bharatiya Janata Party politicians from Rajasthan
Living people
1974 births